Look What This World Did To Us is a studio album by Chris Orrick. Released on April 7, 2015 by Mello Music Group, it was largely well received by critics. The Canadian music publication Exclaim! wrote that the lyrics "range from deeply intimate, to unflinchingly grim, to hilariously self-deprecating, often in the same bar."

Production and release

According to Chris Orrick, at the time of writing the album he'd been reading Charles Bukowski, which somewhat influenced the album's focus on "the daily grind."   About the production, Chris Orrick explained that "for this particular record, I wanted things to be jazzier, more subdued, dustier. I’m a fan of sample based production but I’m really into everything at the end of the day. I like to be able to sound good on anything and I’m open to all kinds of production — I just happen to gravitate more to sample based, “boom bap” style shit." It was released on April 7, 2015 by Mello Music Group.

Reception

HipHopDX gave Look What This World Did To Us a positive review and a score of 3.5/5. Locash Magazine called the album "serious breakout album potential, reminiscent of Atmosphere’s Overcast, or El-P’s Fantastic Damage," and further wrote that "this album is middle class frustration rap, flipped with some dark comedy, and soaked in escapism and alcohol."

HipHopDX opined that "finding peace within the chaos of his cluttered mind, Chris Orrick is intent on controlling his various moods and presenting them to his listening audience. Always looking for a silver lining to his cloud, Chris Orrick’s sense of optimism distinguishes him as a level-headed thinker."  The Canadian music publication Exclaim! wrote that the lyrics "range from deeply intimate, to unflinchingly grim, to hilariously self-deprecating, often in the same bar."

Track listing

Personnel
Credits for Look What This World Did To Us adapted from AllMusic.

Managerial

Chris Orrick – executive producer
Michael Tolle – executive producer

Visuals and imagery

Sarah Dalton – graphic design 
Jeremy Deputat – photography

Performance credits

Chris Orrick – primary artist

Technical and production

Chris Orrick – producer
Charlie Beans – engineer, mixing
Castle – producer
Dayggs – producer
Reed Eller – producer
Hir-O – producer
KuroiOto – producer
Eric Morgeson – mastering
L'Orange – producer
Duke Westlake – producer

References

External links
Look What This World Did To Us on Bandcamp
Look What This World Did To Us at Discogs

2015 debut albums
Mello Music Group albums